Zdravko Grebo (30 July 1947 – 29 January 2019) was a Bosnian law professor at the University of Sarajevo's Law School. He was born in 1947 in Mostar. Zdravko is the founder of Open Society Foundation of Bosnia and Herzegovina (Soros Foundation) as well as the director of the Center for Interdisciplinary Postgraduate Studies of the University of Sarajevo. He also serves as the chief of the Department of the State and International Public Law.

In addition to these, he is the founder of the Helsinki Parliament of Citizens (Bosnia & Herzegovina) as well as author of four books and 150 articles. In 1993, Grebo received an award from the European Rectors Club “For peace, and against racism and xenophobia”, and in 1994 he was honored with The Franklin Four Freedoms Award-medal for work in the field of “freedom from fear”. Since 2011, he was a public advocate of RECOM in Bosnia and Herzegovina. In 2017, he signed the Declaration on the Common Language of the Croats, Serbs, Bosniaks and Montenegrins.

Grebo graduated from the Sarajevo Law School in 1970 and attended the postgraduate course at the Department of Legal Theory of the Belgrade Law School where in 1976 he earned his PhD. From 1972, he lectured at the Sarajevo Law School and became a professor in January 1991. Grebo published and edited books "Kelsen and Marx," "Foundations of Legal System of Socialist Federal Republic of Yugoslavia," and "The Philosophy of Law."

References

1947 births
2019 deaths
Writers from Mostar
Bosnia and Herzegovina jurists
University of Belgrade Faculty of Law alumni
University of Sarajevo alumni
Signatories of the Declaration on the Common Language
Bosnia and Herzegovina writers